Söderala is a locality situated in Söderhamn Municipality, Gävleborg County, Sweden with 949 inhabitants in 2010.

Writer Mare Kandre (1962–2005), was born in Söderala. Olympic sports shooter Fredrik Mossberg (1874-1950) was also born there.

Viking Age Söderala vane, now in the Swedish History Museum in Stockholm was used as a weather vane of Söderala Church until the 18th century.

References

Populated places in Söderhamn Municipality
Hälsingland